Squadrismo was the movement of squadre d’azione (literally ‘action squads’), the fascist militias organized outside the authority of the Italian state and led by local leaders called ras (a title given to the Abyssinian headmen). The militia originally consisted of farmers and the middle-class people creating their own defense against revolutionary socialists. Squadrismo became an important asset for the rise of the National Fascist Party led by Benito Mussolini, using violence to systematically eliminate any political parties which were opposed to Italian Fascism. This violence was not solely an instrument in politics, but was also a vital component of squadrismo identity, which made it difficult for the movement to be tamed. This was shown in the various attempts by Mussolini to control squadrismo violence, with the Pact of Pacification, and finally with the Consolidated Public Safety Act. Squadrismo, which ultimately became the Blackshirts, served as a source of inspiration for Adolf Hitler’s S.A.

Origins
After World War I, there was a general feeling of disillusion. Diffused poverty, economic fractures, and a social and moral political upheaval generated by the mobilisation of the war, contributed to the unstable climate proceeding the armistice. This enabled an excess of violence to be present. Furthermore, (new) farmers were opposed to the new rural trade unions which wanted to control the agrarian economy. The middle-class decided that they required their own defense against the socialists, because the government could not contain them. As a result, a series of middle-class defense leagues were formed. The first squadrismo was thus one which was nationalist, founded on the traditions of the Fasci d'Azione Rivoluzionaria, which was a phenomenon of citizens.

In this context emerges the ‘Fasci di Combattimento’. Founded 23 March 1919 by Benito Mussolini, in the course of a reunion in the San Sepolcro Square in Milan. Squadrismo as a movement expanded instantly after the creation of the ‘Fasci di Combattimento’, and by Spring 1920, fascists put into place a political militia of ‘squadre’ in various parts of Northern Italy, mostly in Trieste. Many of these ‘squadristi’ (name given to individuals in the squadrismo movement) joined the ‘Fasci di Combattimento’, but some remained independent from Mussolini’s control. From this point onward, various assaults by Trieste squads against Socialists and Slavs took place. Thousands of squads formed ‘action squads’ and spread terror throughout the country-side. The squads were groups of thirty to fifty, often led by former army officers. In towns where socialism was still strong, squadrismo was a tool of intimidation. It was so violent that some have described the events as a civil war. This profoundly decreased the Italian government’s credibility, which was seen as incapable of keeping law and order.

The habitus of squadrismo was characterised by violence, which was utilised in a political way, where 'squadristi' acted under the oversight of local leaders, also known as ‘Ras’. The fact that squadrismo had protection from national and local leaders also legitimised and banalised their violence, enhancing the idea that there was no opposition possible to the new Fascist party.

Towards March on Rome
At first the Fascist movement had difficulty gaining power, but it quickly drew attention through its ominous acts of violence. The movement grew exponentially from 1920 onwards with the Fasci di Combattimento launching assaults in Northern Italy in rural areas and contributing to the suppression of all other political and trade union organisations. Membership grew rapidly, and Mussolini soon declared war on socialist organisations, which led to "punitive expeditions" of squadre in the countryside to dismiss socialist headquarters and to fracture trade unions.

During the election period in 1921, the violence continued despite Mussolini's electoral success. 207 political killings occurred, of which substantially more victims were socialist than fascist. Mussolini attempted to reduce the violence with the Pact of Pacification, but it soon became ineffective as it was entirely ignored by squadristi. As a result of failed attempts to discipline them, Mussolini decided to use their violence to his advantage by converting the movement into an organised party. He did so by means of a national congress that met in Rome from 7 to 10 November 1921. The new party was named Partito Nazionale Fascista and stood for order, discipline, and hierarchy.

The March on Rome on 28 October 1922 further enhanced Mussolini’s seizure of power, with thousands of squadristi marching through the Italian capital. King Victor Emmanuel III proceeded to appoint Mussolini to lead the new administration. However, this did not stop squadrismo violence, with thousands of people in black shirts participating in squadrista militancy from 1920 to 1922.

After the March on Rome, Fascism was torn between the state, which wanted to end all illegal violence including squadrismo, and the fasci (including the squadre leaders), who were determined to maintain their power. To finally control the violence at last, Mussolini issued the Consolidated Public Safety Act in 1926, which delegitimised ‘squadristi’ violence.

Conflict between Mussolini and the squadrismo

In an effort to end the escalating violence between the socialist and Squadistsi militias, Mussolini signed an interim Pact of Pacification on August 2 or 3, 1921 with the Italian Socialist Party (PSI) and General Confederation of Labor (CGL), causing most ras in the Northern provinces of Italy to denounce the peace pact. Mussolini had planned to assimilate the mostly self-organising Squadrismo into his movement, but the violence against socialists was compromising his strategy of not wanting to "lose his position on the left" that included the establishment of a Fascist Labor Party or National Labor Party.

A number of squadristi leaders voiced opposition to Mussolini's leadership and plastered posters in the city of Bologna, denouncing “Mussolini as a traitor to Fascism,” Some squadristi paramilitary units completely abandoned Mussolini's fascist movement. There were secret anti-Mussolini meetings that fixated on “Mussolini’s lingering leftist loyalties,” which included his leadership of the Italian Socialist Party (1912–1914) and his admiration for Vladimir Lenin. According to the historian Richard Pipes, during this turbulent times of infighting, “Mussolini would have been glad as late as 1920–21 to take under his wing the Italian Communists, for which he had great affinities.”

Many prominent ras pushed for new leadership, lending their support to Gabriele D’Annunzio to “replace Mussolini.” Grandi and Balbo sought an audience with radical nationalist D’Annunzio in August 1921 and offered him a position to lead the squadristi in an “insurrectionary march on Rome.”  D’Annunzio was vague about in his reply. In September 1919 D’Annunzio and his force of 2,000 armed followers consisting primarily of ex-soldiers marched into Fiume and occupied it for fifteen months.

Mussolini went on the offensive and disparaged the squadrismo, declaring that provincial Fascism was “no longer liberation, but tyranny; no longer protector of the nation, but defense of private interests and of the dullest, deafest, most miserable caste that exists in Italy.” In another terse response, Mussolini warned: “I shall defend this pact with all my strength, and if Fascism does not follow me in collaboration with the Socialists, at least no one can force me to follow Fascism.”

Conceding to the squadrismo
Mussolini was unable to gain significant control over the squadrismo to preserve his old alliance of national syndicalists, revolutionaries and Futurists. At the Third Fascist Congress in Rome on Nov. 7–10, 1921, Mussolini was pressured to concede to the majority delegation of squadristi leaders and members, abandoning his plans for a “Fascist Labor Party” and forced to accept the party as an “association of the fasci and their storm squads.” In return for his concessions, Mussolini was recognized as the undisputed leader of the newly renamed National Fascist Party.

The action squads were to become identified by their black shirts, a motif which ultimately coined the name Blackshirts and became the inspiration for Adolf Hitler's Sturmabteilung during the Third Reich. Mussolini and his followers selected the iconic black shirts of the labourers in the Italian cities of Romagna and Emilia who had originally "adopted their uniforms from the anarchists".

See also
 Fascist Syndicalism

References

Italian Fascism
Paramilitary organisations based in Italy
Terrorism in Italy
Anti-communist organizations